Google Base  was a database provided by Google into which any user can add almost any type of content, such as text, images, and structured information in formats such as XML,  PDF, Excel, RTF, or WordPerfect.  As of September 2010, the product has been downgraded to Google Merchant Center. 

If Google found user-added content relevant, submitted content appeared on its shopping search engine, Google Maps or even the web search. The piece of content could then be labeled with attributes like the ingredients for a recipe or the camera model for stock photography. Because information about the service was leaked before public release, it generated much interest in the information technology community prior to release. Google subsequently responded on their blog with an official statement:

"You may have seen stories today reporting on a new product that we're testing, and speculating about our plans. Here's what's really going on. We are testing a new way for content owners to submit their content to Google, which we hope will complement existing methods such as our web crawl and Google Sitemaps. We think it's an exciting product, and we'll let you know when there's more news."

Files could be uploaded to the Google Base servers by browsing your computer or the web, by various FTP methods, or by API coding. Online tools were provided to view the number of downloads of the user's files, and other performance measures.

On December 17, 2010, it was announced that Google Base's API is deprecated in favor of a set of new APIs known as Google Shopping APIs.

See also
List of Google services and tools
Resources of a Resource – ROR
Base Feeder – Software to create bulk submission Google Base Feeds

External links
 Google Base
 About Google Base
 Official Google Base Blog
 Official Google Blog Press Release
 Google Base API Mashups

References

Beta software
Defunct websites
Base
Internet properties disestablished in 2009
Online databases